Senator Ham may refer to:

Arlene Ham (born 1936), South Dakota State Senate
Levi J. Ham (1805–1887), Maine State Senate

See also
John E. Hamm (1776–1864), Ohio State Senate